Bernadette Therese Nolan (17 October 1960 – 4 July 2013) was an Irish actress, singer and television personality, formerly lead vocalist of the girl group the Nolans. She was the second youngest of sisters Anne, Denise, Maureen, Linda and Coleen. From the age of two, she was brought up in Blackpool, Lancashire, England.

The Nolans began in 1974 and went on to have seven UK Top 20 hits, including "I'm in the Mood for Dancing" (1979), "Gotta Pull Myself Together" (1980) and "Attention to Me" (1981). They won the 1981 Tokyo Music Festival with "Sexy Music". She left the group in 1995 to become an actress. On television, she had roles in the Channel 4 soap opera Brookside from 2000 to 2002 and the ITV police drama The Bill from 2002 to 2005, while her numerous roles in stage musicals included Mrs. Johnstone in Blood Brothers (1998–2000), Hannah Owens in Flashdance: The Musical (2008–2009) and Mama Morton in Chicago (2012). She was also a member of the Nolans line-up that reformed for a successful tour of the UK and Ireland in 2009. She died from breast cancer in July 2013.

Early life and career
Born in Dublin in 1960, Nolan's parents were Tommy and Maureen Nolan. The Nolan family moved from Dublin to Blackpool in 1962 and began performing as the Singing Nolans.

In 1974, the sisters formed the Nolan Sisters, later shortened to the Nolans, and made their TV debut that year on Cliff Richard's show, It's Cliff Richard. In 1975, they supported Frank Sinatra on his European tour. In 1979, they released their biggest hit "I'm in the Mood for Dancing", which reached number three in the UK and was the first of seven top twenty hits. The others, with Bernie Nolan usually singing lead vocals, were "Don't Make Waves", (1980) "Gotta Pull Myself Together" (1980), "Who's Gonna Rock You" (1980), "Attention to Me" (1981), "Chemistry" (1981) and "Don't Love Me Too Hard" (1982). The Nolans sold millions of recordings worldwide, particularly in Japan where they sold over nine million albums and won the 1981 Tokyo Music Festival with the song "Sexy Music". Bernie also composed songs during this time, when she wrote two tracks for their 1982 album Portrait. In 1991, they won  of the 33rd Japan Record Awards for Cover version of Japanese pops.

Acting
Nolan first acted as a cast member on the BBC Saturday morning children's show On the Waterfront. Critics positively reviewed her gift for comedy. The Nolan sisters and their music were a running gag on the show, and she was joined by her sisters for a musical performance during at least one episode. She left the group in 1995 to concentrate on her own acting career, which began with her 1993 performance in the stage play, The Devil Rides Out. She played Mrs. Johnstone in Willy Russell's Blood Brothers in the UK tour for over two years. She was the first of four Nolan sisters to have played the role, being followed by Denise, Linda and then Maureen. For this, the sisters earned a place in the Guinness Book of Records as the most siblings to play the same role at different times in a professional production.

In 2000, Nolan joined the cast of Channel 4's soap opera Brookside as Diane Murray after being noticed by Paul Marquess whilst starring in Blood Brothers. She left in 2002 to play Sheelagh Murphy in ITV's police drama series The Bill, which she starred in until 2005.

In 2006, Nolan took part in Channel 4's series The Games. Her stint on the game was to raise money for charity, including Alzheimer's and children's charities. In 2007, she starred in the play Mum's the Word, playing the character 'Robin' which she reprised in the 2008 tour (alongside her sister, Maureen who played Jill) and once again in 2010. During the summer season of 2007, she appeared at the Blackpool North Pier Theatre in her own production, Soap Queens (And Kings!).

In 2008, Nolan appeared in the UK touring production of Flashdance the Musical for over a year, playing Hannah Owens. In January and February 2010, she participated in the ITV celebrity reality television programme Popstar to Operastar, reaching the final, where she lost to Darius Campbell. In 2012, she appeared as Mama Morton, in the UK tour of the musical Chicago.

Return to singing
Nolan released the single "Macushla" in 2004 with the proceeds going to charity. It peaked at No. 38 in the UK Singles Chart in March 2004. Regarding this release, Lorraine Kelly wrote: "I wouldn't have expected anything else from one of the hardest working women in showbiz". In 2005 she released her debut solo album All By Myself. The album consists mainly of power ballads, including the song "Better Place", written by Nolan's husband in memory of their daughter, Kate, who was stillborn in 1998. In 2009, four of the Nolan sisters, Bernie, Coleen, Linda and Maureen, reformed for a successful 23 date tour of the UK and Ireland. To coincide with the tour, they released an album, I'm in the Mood Again'', which reached No.22 in the UK Album Charts.

Personal life
Bernie Nolan married drummer Steve Doneathy in 1996, in Lancashire. The couple lived in St Anne's on Sea, Lancashire, and then in Weybridge, Surrey. She gave birth to their daughter Kate in 1998, who was stillborn and another daughter, Erin in 1999, who was 14 years old when Bernie died in 2013. Bernie had previously been in a relationship with Bradley Walsh.

Illness and death
On 23 April 2010, it was announced that Nolan was suffering from breast cancer. In October 2010, she stated that she was cancer-free after having undergone chemotherapy and a mastectomy, and was taking herceptin. In February 2012, she announced that she was no longer taking cancer treatment drugs, and was completely free of cancer. At the end of October 2012, Nolan announced that the cancer had returned and had metastasised to her brain, lungs, liver and bones. Anne and Linda Nolan suffered from the disease in 2000 and 2006, respectively; both recovered.

Nolan died in her sleep, at her home in Surrey, on 4 July 2013, aged 52. Nolan's funeral service was held on 17 July 2013 at the Grand Theatre, Blackpool and she was later cremated at Carleton Crematorium. Her ashes were then buried alongside those of her stillborn daughter.

References

External links
 
 

1960 births
2013 deaths
20th-century Irish actresses
21st-century Irish actresses
Deaths from breast cancer
Deaths from lung cancer in England
Deaths from brain cancer in England
Deaths from liver cancer
Deaths from bone cancer
Irish autobiographers
Irish women singers
Irish sopranos
Irish emigrants to the United Kingdom
Irish television actresses
Irish television personalities
Musicians from Blackpool
People from County Dublin
Popstar to Operastar contestants
Sony Music Publishing artists
Women autobiographers